The Richest Cat in the World is a 1986 American made-for-television adventure drama film directed by Greg Beeman and released by Walt Disney Television. It originally aired March 9, 1986 as a presentation of The Disney Sunday Movie on ABC.

Plot
The death of millionaire Oscar Kohlmeyer leaves an inheritance to a talking cat called Leo Kohlmeyer. Leo's inheritance is worth five million dollars while Oscar's nephew (Mr. Rigsby) gets twenty-five thousand dollars on the condition he doesn't contest the will. Being greedy and bossy, Mrs. Rigsby forces her husband to contest. The Rigsbys try to kidnap the cat.

Primary cast
 Ramon Bieri as Oscar Kohlmeyer
 Steven Kampmann as Howard Piggans
 Caroline McWilliams as Paula Rigsby
 Steve Vinovich as Gus Barrett
 George Wyner as Victor Rigsby
 Brandon Call as Bart
 Kellie Martin as Veronica
 Palmer (the cat)

See also
The Aristocats - Another Disney film with a similar plot.

References

External links
 
 Commercial trailer (1986)

1986 television films
1986 drama films
1980s adventure drama films
ABC network original films
American television films
American adventure drama films
Disney television films
Films directed by Greg Beeman
Films about cats